Biophytum umbraculum (the South Pacific palm) is a plant species in the family Oxalidaceae. It is reported from India, China, Indonesia, Malaysia, Burma (Myanmar), New Guinea, Philippines, Thailand, Vietnam, tropical Africa, and Madagascar. The species is an annual herb up to 15 cm tall, bearing sessile umbels.

Biophytum umbraculum Welw., Apont. 55: 590. 1859.

References

External links
 

umbraculum
Flora of Yunnan
Flora of tropical Asia
Flora of Africa
Flora of Madagascar
Plants described in 1859